11
This article lists the orders and deliveries for the Airbus A320neo family, currently produced by Airbus.

Orders and deliveries by type

Orders and deliveries by year

A320neo family orders and deliveries by year (cumulative)

Data 
<noinclude>

Orders and deliveries graph

Data

Orders by customer
The following table shows total firm orders of A320neo family aircraft by customer and variant . In the engine columns, the boxes filled in with a * signify that the airline has ordered all their A320neo jets with that particular engine. Blank boxes in those columns signify that the airline or Airbus have not, as of now, specified which engine will be ordered.

Deliveries by customer
The following table shows total deliveries of A320neo family aircraft by customer and variant.

See also

Competition between Airbus and Boeing
List of Airbus A320 orders
List of Boeing 737 MAX orders

References

External links
 Airbus Orders and Deliveries

Orders Neo
320neo